Arivum Anbum ( or ) is an Indian Tamil-language song released on YouTube on April 23, 2020, in response to the COVID-19 pandemic in India. The song was composed by Ghibran and lyrics by Kamal Haasan. The song was sung by 12 Various singers. Lydian Nadhaswaram has played the piano for the song.

The concept for Arivum Anbum was created and directed by Kamal Haasan and promoted by Think Music India. The song was recorded by the all artistes from the comforts of their homes and was later put together by Ghibran.

The lyrics of the song talk about the need to use our heart and intelligence to battle the crisis. It also tells us that selfless love is the key to overcome any kind of obstacle that we face in life. The video also features visuals of the mass exodus of migrant labourers from cities across the country.

Cast 
 Kamal Haasan
 Ghibran
 Anirudh Ravichander
 Yuvan Shankar Raja
 Shankar Mahadevan
 Bombay Jayashri
 Sid Sriram
 Devi Sri Prasad
 Shruti Haasan
 Andrea Jeremiah
 Siddharth
 Mugen Rao

Production 
Music director Ghibran said, “One day, Kamal Haasan and I got talking. It was his idea to come up with an anthem about how the world would function post the coronavirus crisis. He suggested that I compose a tune and he would pen the lyrics for the same.” Kamal Haasan asked two-three days time to write the lyrics but ended up giving it in just three hours.

Ghibran revealed, “We started with Kamal sir’s portion and recorded lines with other singers. The toughest part of the song lies in the chorus. I launched a talent hunt of sorts and chose 37 aspiring singers to sing the chorus. Co-ordinating with them made the whole process interesting and challenging.”

Release and reception 
The song was released on Think Music India YouTube channel on 23 April 2020.

References

External links 
 

Songs about the COVID-19 pandemic
Indian songs
Tamil-language songs